James M. McMillian (March 11, 1948 – May 16, 2016) was an American professional basketball player. After starring at Thomas Jefferson High School in Brooklyn, McMillian played college basketball at Columbia University. He led Columbia to a three-year mark of 63–14, and their last NCAA Tournament appearance in 1968, his sophomore year. The tourney ended with a third-place finish for Columbia in the East regional, and Columbia ended that 1967–68 season the sixth-ranked college team in the nation.

"Jimmy Mac" not only was a three-time All-American and All-Ivy Leaguer, he was All-East each year, the ECAC Sophomore of the Year, and became the first person ever to earn the Haggerty Award in each of his three varsity seasons.

He scored 1,758 career points then a record, now second and averaged 22.9 points per game second-best then and now. McMillian is also second in career rebounds (743) and holds the season records for field goals in a season (253) and career (677). But despite their outstanding winning percentages, his Columbia teams managed only one Ivy League title in a period when they battled tough Princeton teams with Geoff Petrie and John Hummer and Penn teams with Dave Wohl and Corky Calhoun.

He chose the Lakers and spent three years there, scoring 3,714 points, an average of 15.3 per game. In 1972, he helped lead the Lakers to an NBA Championship, averaging 19.1 points per game in the playoffs. He was a key factor in the Lakers' record-setting 33-game winning streak that season. McMillian, who was in his second season that year, replaced Elgin Baylor at forward and the team immediately launched their streak. After the retirement of Wilt Chamberlain, the Lakers needed a center and traded McMillian to the Buffalo Braves for Elmore Smith. He later played for the New York Knicks and Portland Trail Blazers.

At the end of his career he moved to Italy and played for Sinudyne Bologna for two seasons winning two Italian titles and reaching the final of the European Champions' Cup in 1981 where he did not play due to a serious injury.

McMillian died from complications of heart failure on May 16, 2016.

References

External links
Player Profile @ basketball-reference.com
The book "Buffalo, Home of the Braves", complete narrative and photo history of the Buffalo Braves

1948 births
2016 deaths
African-American basketball players
All-American college men's basketball players
American expatriate basketball people in Italy
American men's basketball players
Basketball players from North Carolina
Buffalo Braves players
Columbia Lions men's basketball players
Los Angeles Lakers draft picks
Los Angeles Lakers players
New York Knicks players
Parade High School All-Americans (boys' basketball)
People from Raeford, North Carolina
Portland Trail Blazers players
Shooting guards
Small forwards
Columbia College (New York) alumni
Thomas Jefferson High School (Brooklyn) alumni
Virtus Bologna players
20th-century African-American sportspeople
21st-century African-American people